Radomir Knoll (Radomirska Mogila \'ra-do-mir-ska mo-'gi-la\) rises to approximately 300 m in Prespa Glacier, eastern Livingston Island in the South Shetland Islands, Antarctica.  It is formed by the south extremity of an offshoot of Friesland Ridge, Tangra Mountains that extends to the south-southeast from St. Cyril Peak and surmounts Chavei Cove to the south and southwest.

The feature is named after the Bulgarian town of Radomir.

Location

Maps
 L.L. Ivanov et al. Antarctica: Livingston Island and Greenwich Island, South Shetland Islands. Scale 1:100000 topographic map. Sofia: Antarctic Place-names Commission of Bulgaria, 2005.
 L.L. Ivanov. Antarctica: Livingston Island and Greenwich, Robert, Snow and Smith Islands. Scale 1:120000 topographic map.  Troyan: Manfred Wörner Foundation, 2009.  
 Antarctic Digital Database (ADD). Scale 1:250000 topographic map of Antarctica. Scientific Committee on Antarctic Research (SCAR). Since 1993, regularly upgraded and updated.
 L.L. Ivanov. Antarctica: Livingston Island and Smith Island. Scale 1:100000 topographic map. Manfred Wörner Foundation, 2017.

References
 Radomir Knoll. SCAR Composite Gazetteer of Antarctica
 Bulgarian Antarctic Gazetteer. Antarctic Place-names Commission. (details in Bulgarian, basic data in English)

External links
 Radomir Knoll. Copernix satellite image

Tangra Mountains